A royal address is a public speech by a monarch or member of a royal family. This may refer to:
 A speech from the throne as is customary in many nations, including during
 the State Opening of Parliament in the United Kingdom
 the Opening of the Canadian parliament
 the Imperial Investiture in Japan
 Prinsjesdag in the Netherlands
 A Christmas message by the reigning monarch, including
 the Royal Christmas Message in the UK
 the Christmas Eve National Speech in Spain
 similar messages elsewhere
 A royal address to the nation, an address to the United Kingdom and the Commonwealth, an extraordinary broadcast during times of national importance by the British monarch
Commonwealth Day, formerly Empire Day, where the Head of the Commonwealth makes an address to the Commonwealth of Nations.

See also 
 State of the Nation (disambiguation)
 King's speech (disambiguation)